Yeongwol Eom clan is a Korean clan. Their Bon-gwan is in Yeongwol County, Gangwon Province. Eom Im-ui (hangul: 엄림의; hanja: 嚴林義) was a descendant of Yan Guang.

The Korean American actress Jamie Chung, who has maternal ancestry from Yeongwol County, is a descendant of the Yeongwol Eom clan.

See also 
 Um (Korean surname)
 Korean clan names of foreign origin

References

External links 
 

 
Korean clan names of Chinese origin